Igor Vladimirovich Lukashin (born 7 August 1979, in Penza) is Russian diver who, along with Dmitri Sautin, won the gold medal at the 2000 Summer Olympics in the men's 10 m platform synchronized event.

References

1979 births
Living people
Russian male divers
Olympic divers of Russia
Divers at the 2000 Summer Olympics
Olympic gold medalists for Russia
Sportspeople from Penza
Penza State University alumni
Olympic medalists in diving
Medalists at the 2000 Summer Olympics
World Aquatics Championships medalists in diving